Teretriphora huttoni is a species of small deepwater sea snail, a marine gastropod mollusc in the family Triphoridae.

References

 Powell A W B, New Zealand Mollusca, William Collins Publishers Ltd, Auckland, New Zealand 1979 

Triphoridae
Gastropods of New Zealand
Gastropods described in 1908